George C. "Chris" Ortloff (born September 20, 1947) is an American journalist, politician, and convicted sex offender from New York.

Biography
Ortloff was born on September 20, 1947, in Lake Placid, Essex County, New York. He graduated M.A. from Rensselaer Polytechnic Institute in 1969, and M.A. in journalism from the University of Michigan. He served two tours of duty in the Vietnam War from 1970 to 1972. Ortloff served as the Chief of Ceremonies and Awards for the Lake Placid Olympic Organizing Committee for the 1980 Winter Olympics in Lake Placid. He was a news anchor for WPTZ TV (NBC affiliate) from 1982 to 1986.

He entered politics as a Republican. On February 18, 1986, he was elected to the New York State Assembly, to fill the vacancy caused by the election of Andrew W. Ryan, Jr. as D.A. of Clinton County. Ortloff was re-elected many times and remained in the Assembly until 2006, sitting in the 186th, 187th, 188th, 189th, 190th, 191st, 192nd, 193rd, 194th, 195th and 196th New York State Legislatures. Afterwards he was appointed to the New York State Board of Parole.

On October 13, 2008, Ortloff was arrested on federal charges of attempting to solicit sex with minors. On December 24, 2008, he pleaded guilty to a felony charge of online enticement of minors. His sentencing was originally set for April 23, 2009., but was pushed back four times, first to August 11, 2009, then to November 9, 2009,  to March 8, 2010, and finally to July 13, 2010. Ortloff surrendered to authorities to begin serving time prior to his actual sentencing.  On August 9, 2010, he was finally sentenced, to 150 months 
 in prison, lifetime supervision, and a $50,000 fine.

As of February 2019, Ortloff was incarcerated at Federal Correctional Institution, Danbury. He was released October 2019.

References 

1947 births
American politicians convicted of sex offences
American people convicted of child sexual abuse
American television news anchors
Living people
New York (state) politicians convicted of crimes
People from Lake Placid, New York
Rensselaer Polytechnic Institute alumni
Republican Party members of the New York State Assembly
University of Michigan alumni